Tasha the Amazon, born Tasha Schumann, is a Canadian rapper, singer-songwriter, hip hop producer and host to Animalogic's youtube channel. She is best known for her debut EP Die Every Day, which was nominated at the 2017 Juno Awards for Rap Recording of the Year.

Biography 
Born to German and Jamaican parents, she was raised in Kitchener, Ontario. She is the niece of Erroll Starr, a rhythm and blues singer prominent in the 1980s.

She moved to Toronto after high school, studying psychology at the University of Toronto, where she launched her music career.

Career 
She released a number of solo singles between 2013 and 2015, including a mixtape called FIDIYOOTDEM before releasing her debut album Die Every Day in 2016. In 2017 she was nominated for a Juno Award for Rap Album of the year. Later that year, she won the MuchMusic Video Award for Best Hip Hop Video for "Picasso Leaning", the first female artist ever to win that award.

She collaborated with Danger for a track on his debut album 太鼓 (2017).

She released her second album, Black Moon in 2019.

In November 2020, she starred on Animalogic's YouTube channel. She hosts the Floralogic episodes where she talks about different types of plants and fungi.

Discography

Studio albums

References

Canadian women rappers
Canadian hip hop record producers
Musicians from Kitchener, Ontario
Black Canadian musicians
Black Canadian women
Living people
Canadian people of Jamaican descent
Canadian people of German descent
Canadian women record producers
Women hip hop record producers
21st-century Canadian women musicians
21st-century Canadian rappers
Year of birth missing (living people)
21st-century women rappers